is the first Japanese studio album by South Korean girl group Kara. It was released on November 24, 2010, in four editions: CD+DVD, CD+Photobook (28-pages), CD-Only First Press coming with Korean versions of the songs "Sweet Days", "Love Is", and "Binks" and a CD-Only Normal Press coming with no bonus tracks. The album has topped the Oricon Weekly Album Charts several times and was eventually certified as Double Platinum by the RIAJ.

Composition 
The album contains two original Japanese songs. There are five songs that were included on the group's fourth Korean mini-album Jumping (2010) including "Sweet Days" which was titled "With" on the mini-album and the second single Jumping. There are two songs which was previously released in Korean on their third mini-album Lupin (2010) and these are "Lupin" and "Umbrella". The debut single, Mister was previously released in Korean on their second studio album Revolution (2009).

Chart performance 
Girl's Talk had sold over 107,000 copies which placed on number 2 at the Oricon Weekly Album charts, behind Hikaru Utada's Utada Hikaru Single Collection Vol. 2, which sold over 231,000 copies in the same week. This is the first time in 6 years and 9 months for a foreign Asian girl group to sell over 100,000 copies on its first week in Japan since Twelve Girls Band did back in March 2004 with the release of their album Kikō: Shining Energy. The album's first week sales doubles that of Kara Best 2007–2010 first week sales (51,000 copies) which was released back in September.

The album spent 14 weeks in the Top 10 spot of the Oricon Weekly Album charts. It was eventually certified Platinum by the RIAJ. On February 12, 2011, the album eventually peaked at number one after spending over 12 weeks in the charts, making it their first number-one album. The album managed to sell over 300,000 copies making them the first foreign female group to sell over 300,000 copies since Destiny's Child's #1's (2005). On November 18, 2011, it was announced that the album had already sold over 500,000 copies.

Track listings

Charts and sales

Weekly charts

Year-end charts

Sales and certifications

References 

2010 albums
Dance-pop albums by South Korean artists
Kara (South Korean group) albums
Universal Records albums
Japanese-language albums